"Head over Heels" is the debut single by American girl group Allure, released in February 1997. It is from their 1997 eponymous debut album. The song features a rap by American rapper Nas, and also contains a sample of "The Bridge" by MC Shan. It peaked at No. 35 on the Billboard Hot 100.

Critical reception
Ralph Tee from Music Week'''s RM'' commented, "Mariah Carey launches her new label through Epic with this bump'n'grindin' street soul churner by these four New York soul divas. To help things along, Nas makes a guest appearance with a few words, while Mariah herself appears briefly in the video. As a song it's a little predictable, but its melody grows on you after a few spins and, considering everybody involved, you can only expect this to do well."

Music video

The official music video for the song was directed by Diane Martel.

Charts

Weekly charts

Year-end charts

References

External links
 

1997 songs
1997 debut singles
Allure (band) songs
Crave Records singles
Music videos directed by Diane Martel
Nas songs
Song recordings produced by Mariah Carey
Songs written by Mariah Carey
Songs written by Marley Marl
Songs written by MC Shan
Songs written by Nas
Song recordings produced by Trackmasters
Songs written by Samuel Barnes (songwriter)
Songs written by Jean-Claude Olivier